Gloucester was a provincial electoral district for the Legislative Assembly of New Brunswick, Canada from the 1828 election of the 9th New Brunswick Legislature.  It mirrored Gloucester County, and used a bloc voting system to elect candidates.  It was abolished with the 1973 electoral redistribution, divided up into five first past the post districts: Caraquet, Nepisiguit-Chaleur, Nigadoo-Chaleur, Shippagan-les-Îles and Tracadie.

Members of the Legislative Assembly

Election results

References

Former provincial electoral districts of New Brunswick
1974 disestablishments in New Brunswick